The 1948 Rhode Island Rams football team was an American football team that represented Rhode Island State College (later renamed the University of Rhode Island) as a member of the Yankee Conference during the 1948 college football season. In its fourth season under head coach Bill Beck, the team compiled a 2–4–1 record (1–3 against conference opponents) and finished in last place in the conference. The team played its home games at Meade Field in Kingston, Rhode Island.

Schedule

References

Rhode Island State
Rhode Island Rams football seasons
Rhode Island State Rams football